From May 2 to 8, 1999, a large tornado outbreak took place across much of the Central and parts of the Eastern United States, as well as southern Canada. During this week-long event, 152 tornadoes touched down in these areas. The most dramatic events unfolded during the afternoon of May 3 through the early morning hours of May 4 when more than half of these storms occurred. Oklahoma experienced its largest tornado outbreak on record, with 70 confirmed. The most notable of these was the F5 Bridge Creek–Moore tornado which devastated Oklahoma City and suburban communities. The tornado killed 36 people and injured 583 others; losses amounted to $1 billion, making it the first billion-dollar tornado in history. Overall, 50 people lost their lives during the outbreak and damage amounted to $1.4 billion.

On May 2, a strong area of low pressure moved out of the Rocky Mountains and into the High Plains, producing scattered severe weather and ten tornadoes in Nebraska. The following day, atmospheric conditions across Oklahoma became significantly more favorable for an outbreak of severe weather. Wind profiles across the region strongly favored tornadic activity, with the Storm Prediction Center stating, "it became more obvious something major was looming" by the afternoon hours. Numerous supercell thunderstorms developed across the state as well as bordering areas in Kansas and Texas. Over the following 48 hours, May 3–4, 116 tornadoes touched down across the Central United States. Following the extensive outbreak, activity became increasingly scattered from May 5 to 8, with 26 tornadoes touching down across the Eastern United States and Quebec.



Confirmed tornadoes

See also

1999 Oklahoma tornado outbreak
Tornadoes of 1999

Notes

References

1999 Oklahoma
Tornadoes in Arkansas
Tornadoes in Quebec
Tornadoes in Georgia (U.S. state)
Tornadoes in Illinois
Tornadoes in Indiana
Tornadoes in Kansas
Tornadoes in Kentucky
Tornadoes in Louisiana
Tornadoes in Michigan
Tornadoes in Mississippi
Tornadoes in Missouri
Tornadoes in Nebraska
Tornadoes in North Carolina
Tornadoes in Oklahoma
Tornadoes in South Carolina
Tornadoes in Tennessee
Tornadoes in Texas
Tornadoes in Wisconsin
Tornadoes of 1999
May 1999 events in North America
1999 disasters in Canada
1999 natural disasters in the United States
1999-05